Milcovul (called Risipiți until 1964) is a commune in Vrancea County, Romania. It is located in the historical region of Muntenia. It is composed of two villages, Lămotești and Milcovul, and also included Gologanu and Răstoaca from 1968, until these became separate communes again in 2004.

In 1227 Milcov became the seat of the Diocese of Cumania, a Roman Catholic bishopric which served the Cumans and the Teutonic Knights in the Burzenland. The diocese was destroyed during the Mongol invasion of Europe in 1241.

References

Communes in Vrancea County
Localities in Muntenia